The Second International, 1889–1914 is a 1956 history book about the Second International written by historian James Joll.

Bibliography 

 
 
 
 
 
 
 
 
 
 

1956 non-fiction books
English-language books
Books about socialism
Second International